Dahakhani is a village development committee in Chitwan District in Bagmati Province of southern Nepal. At the time of the 2011 Nepal census it had a population of 4,803 people (2,304 male; 2,499 female) living in 939 individual households.

References

Populated places in Chitwan District